The North Coast Papuan slender-toed gecko (Nactus septentrionalis) is a species of lizard in the family Gekkonidae. It is found in Papua New Guinea and Indonesia.

References

Nactus
Reptiles of Papua New Guinea
Reptiles described in 2020
Geckos of New Guinea